Fred Grinham (22 November 1881 – 19 March 1972) was a British-born American cyclist. He competed in three events at the 1904 Summer Olympics.

References

External links
 

1881 births
1972 deaths
American male cyclists
Olympic cyclists of the United States
Cyclists at the 1904 Summer Olympics
Cyclists from Greater London
British emigrants to the United States